Josef Vavroušek (15 September 1944 in Prague, Czechoslovakia - 18 March 1995 in Slovakia) was a Czech environmentalist, scientist and politician, and the founder of the Environment for Europe process. 

He obtained his PhD (equivalent) from the Czech Technical University in Prague in 1975 then worked for 15 years (1975–1990) as a scientist in the field of cybernetics, general systems theory, science of science, and human environment, specializing in macro-ecology of Man and environmental policy. During this period he was a member of the executive body of the Ecological Section of the Biological Society, Czechoslovak Academy of Sciences (1985–1991), one of the founding members of the first executive body of the Circle of Independent Intelligentsia (1988–1989) and a member of the Club of Rome. He was also one of the founders of the Civic Forum and later of the Civic Movement in Czechoslovakia and a member of their executive bodies.

He coordinated (with Bedřich Moldan) the translation of Limits to Growth into Czech.

In 1989 Vavroušek was one of the leaders of the Czechoslovakian Velvet Revolution. In April 1990 he became vice-chairman of the State Commission for Scientific and Technical Development (responsible for the environment), and then in June 1990 he became the first (and last) environment Minister of the Federal Government of Czechoslovakia. It was in this role that Vavroušek proposed and organized the first pan-European conference of environment Ministers. 

Josef Vavroušek formulated his "Ten Commandments" of values compatible and incompatible with a sustainable way of life in 1993 and considered it a preliminary proposal. He died in spring 1995 and so he could not finish it.

As environment Minister he headed the Czechoslovakian delegation to the Rio Summit in 1992, but then political changes and the division of the country brought his ministerial career to a premature end. Returning to science he joined the Institute of Applied Ecology at Charles University and then went on to found and become president of the Society for Sustainable Living (established in October, 1992). Vavroušek’s contribution to European environmental cooperation was to bring the interdisciplinary experience and understanding of how human systems and the environment work into mainstream political parlance across the new Europe at the time of its birth and to emphasize the importance of human values and environmental ethics in the search for sustainable ways of living. Vavroušek was killed with his daughter Petra by an avalanche on 18 March 1995 while they were hiking in the Roháče mountains in Slovakia.

Bibliography
Vavroušek, J. (1993). Perspektivy lidských hodnot slučitelných s trvale udržitelným způsobem života. In P. Nováček & J. Vavroušek (Eds), Lidské hodnoty a trvale udržitelný způsob života: Sborník přednášek (pp. 91–100). Olomouc, Czech Republic: Vydavatelství Univerzity Palackého.

References

Czechoslovak environmentalists
Czechoslovak democracy activists
1944 births
1995 deaths
Czech activists
Government ministers of Czechoslovakia
Recipients of Medal of Merit (Czech Republic)
Civic Movement Government ministers
Czech ecologists
Czech environmentalists
Czech Technical University in Prague alumni
Deaths in avalanches
People from Prague